Ahmad al-Suhrawardi (1256 – 1340), was a Persian calligrapher and musician from Baghdad, who lived in the Ilkhanate era. 

Belonging to a prominent family of mystics, Ahmad was most likely the grandson of the Sufi master Shihab al-Din 'Umar al-Suhrawardi (died 1234). Ahmad was the student of Yaqut al-Musta'simi (died 1298) and is said to have transcribed the Qur'an 33 times. Most famous of his works are monumental 30-volume Qur'an manuscripts, illuminated by Muhammad ibn Aybak ibn 'Abdallah. Ahmad also designed many architectural inscriptions in Baghdad.

References

Sources 
 
 

14th-century Iranian people
People of the Ilkhanate
13th-century Iranian people
1256 births
1340 deaths
People from Baghdad
Iranian calligraphers
Iranian musicians
Calligraphers of the medieval Islamic world